Montmorency may refer to:

Literature
 Montmorency (character), the protagonist of the Montmorency series
 Montmorency (novel), 2003, the first novel in the Montmorency series
 Montmorency, a fictional dog in Jerome K. Jerome's novel Three Men in a Boat
 Montmorency series, Victorian-era London suspense fiction books by Eleanor Updale

People 
 Anne de Montmorency  (1493–1567), French soldier, statesman and diplomat
 Charles I de Montmorency (d. 1381), French soldier
 Floris of Montmorency (1528–1570), noble and diplomat from the Spanish Netherlands
 Henri II de Montmorency, French noble and Viceroy of New France
 Philip de Montmorency (1524–1568), Count of Horn, Belgian born statesman from the Spanish Netherlands
 Rachel de Montmorency (1891–1961), English painter and stained glass artist
 Raymond de Montmorency (1867–1900), Canadian-born British Army officer and member of Anglo Irish family

Places

In Australia
 Montmorency, Victoria, suburb of Melbourne

In Canada
 Montmorency River, a tributary of St. Lawrence river in Capitale-Nationale, Quebec
 Montmorency Falls, Quebec
 Montmorency Forest, protected forest in Capitale-Nationale, Quebec
 Collège Montmorency, also known as Cégep Montmorency, a Francophone public college in Laval, Quebec
 Parc Montmorency, a park located in Quebec City and home to the Parliaments of Lower Canada, Canada East and Quebec from 1791 to 1883
 Montmorency station (Montreal Metro), a Montreal Metro station in Laval-des-Rapides, Laval, Quebec, serving the Orange Line
 Montmorency (electoral district), Quebec
 Montmorency (provincial electoral district), Quebec
 Montmorency, Quebec, a former municipality amalgamated in 1976 to form Beauport, Quebec City

In France
 Montmorency, Val-d'Oise, Val-d'Oise département
 Soisy-sous-Montmorency, Val-d'Oise département
 Montmorency-Beaufort, Aube département
 Rue de Montmorency, Paris

In United States
 Montmorenci, Indiana
 Montmorency County, Michigan
 Montmorency Township (disambiguation)

Transit
 Montmorency station (Montreal Metro), a subway station Laval, Quebec, Canada
 Montmorency railway station, Victoria, in Montmorency, Victoria, Australia

Other uses
 Duke of Montmorency, a title that was created several times for members of the Montmorency family
 House of Montmorency, one of the oldest noble families in France
 Montmorency cherry, a variety of sour cherry